Transport Matters is an Australian political party. It is a party in Victoria, Australia registered by the Victorian Electoral Commission on 30 April 2018, after an application was received by the VEC on 9 January 2018.

History
The party was co-founded by Rod Barton and André Baruch, both hire car operators.

Most of the party's members are taxi drivers or taxi licence owners involved in a class action lawsuit against Uber for loss of income between 2014 and 2017, when the company operated in Victoria as an illegal taxicab operation. Uber was legalised in Victoria in August 2017 following the deregulation of the taxi/ride-share industry in the state.

In May 2019, more than 6,000 taxi and car-hire drivers, operators and licence owners across four states commenced the class action in the Victorian Supreme Court.

Transport Matters was registered federally on 24 March 2020. However, the party was voluntarily de-registered federally on 16 December 2021, having never competed at a federal election.

Parliamentary Actions 
The party was elected with the main goal of representing the taxi and hire car industry in Victoria after the commercial passenger vehicle industry was deregulated in 2017.

Policies 
The party describes itself as possessing a centre-left policy agenda; in addition to the party's core focus on transport, the party also champions environmental issues and small business interests. The party has advocated for major transport projects including the East West Link, then North East Link, the West Gate Tunnel, the Suburban Rail Loop and a fully publicly owned Melbourne Airport rail line.

The party's policy priorities include:

 Commercial Passenger Vehicle Industry; 
 Addressing Homelessness;
 Free Tram Zone; 
 Regional Bus Services;
 Improving the Transport and Infrastructure Network; and
 Public Transport.

Commercial Passenger Vehicle Industry 

 Opposed to the deregulation of the vehicle for hire, taxicab and hire car industry in Victoria.
 That perpetual taxi and hire car licence holders in Victoria are fully compensated for the compulsory acquisition of their property (licences).
 That Uber entered the Victorian industry illegally in 2017.
 Improve driver income.
 Introduce environmentally sustainable vehicle fleet.
 Minimum ANCAP 5 Star safety rating for commercial passenger vehicles  (CPVs).
 Compulsory road worthy certificate required with license renewal.
 Proof of insurance.
 Identification on vehicle that you are a Commercial Passenger Vehicle.
 That CPVs should be exempt from tolls.

Homelessness 

 The party supports housing first as 'it is important that every Australian has access to safe, stable and affordable housing."
 Additional crisis and transitional housing. 
 Additional resources including housing, social works and mental health workers.
 Early intervention through the provision of additional wrap around services at the crisis and transitional housing stage.
 Need for additional mental health nurses and psychologists.

Public Transport 

 Public transport should be free for all passengers under the age of 18 or over the age of 65.
 Should be free for full-time students. 
 Should be reduced for post-graduate students. 
 Victoria's Free Tram Zone should be extended to include major inner-city hospitals and academic precincts. 
 Provision of safe bike storage at every bus, train and tram stop. 
 Real time GPS information at every tram, train and bus stop. 
 A full review of the bus services in the outer suburbs should be conducted to improve the network.

Bicycle Infrastructure 

 The party supports the 'One Meter apart' policy to protect cyclists from traffic.
 Community consultation for the implementation of bike lanes.
 Inclusion of mountain bike trails and bike parks in local council areas. 
 Educating young Australians on bike safety.
 Supports the implementation of legislation to protect pedestrians injured by cyclists.

Other Areas 

 Improving rural and regional towns ability to connect by looking into alternative bus network and public transport options. 
 Removing toll roads and making them publicly owned. 
 Increasing transparency between government departments and the public to improve outcomes.
 Improving Australia's take up of electric and hydrogen vehicles and power.

Electoral history

Victoria State Election
At the 2018 Victorian state election, the party was the beneficiary of a highly convoluted series of preference flows in the group voting ticket for the Legislative Council organised by Glenn Druery. With these beneficial preferences it was estimated that the party could get elected on less than 0.3% of the vote in the Eastern Metropolitan Region. Ultimately, the party polled 0.62% of the vote and Barton was elected to the Legislative Council for a four-year term.

Political representatives

Members of parliament
Victoria
 Rod Barton  – Victorian Legislative Council, 2018–2022

See also
 Taxi Operators Political Service (1997-2001)

References

External links
Transport Matters Party official website of the Victorian party

2018 establishments in Australia
Political parties established in 2018
Political parties in Victoria (Australia)